Tom Lowenstein (born 1941) is an English poet, ethnographer, teacher, cultural historian and translator. Beginning his working life as a school teacher, he visited Alaska in 1973 and went on to become particularly noted for his work on Inupiaq (north Alaskan Eskimo) ethnography, conducting research in Point Hope, Alaska, between 1973 and 1988. His writing also encompasses several collections of poetry, as well as books related to Buddhism. Since 1986 Lowenstein has lived and continued teaching in London.

Biography

Tom Lowenstein was born near London in 1941. He went to Leighton Park School, then studied at Queens' College, Cambridge, and the University of Leicester. After university, he taught in secondary schools in London (1966–71), then for three years taught literature and creative writing in the US at Northwestern University, Evanston, Illinois. In 1973 he worked for the Alaska State Museum, and went on to live on and off (between 1975 and 1988) in the Alaskan village of Point Hope, recording and translating the local history and legends.

He was awarded a Guggenheim Fellowship in 1979 in the field of Folklore and Popular Culture. Other awards for his research have come from Northwestern University, the Nuffield Foundation, the Society of Authors, the British Academy, the National Endowment for the Arts, the Leverhulme Trust, the Arctic Institute of North America, The American Philosophical Society, Alaska Humanities Forum, and North Slope Borough, Alaska.
 
He subsequently (1981–90) followed up an interest in Buddhist literature by studying Sanskrit and Pali at Cambridge University, SOAS and the University of Washington.

Lowenstein has also written texts for music collaborations, including with the composer Ed Hughes Sun, Moon and Women Shouting (1999) and The Sybil of Cumae (2001), and the libretto for Rachel Stott's oratorio Companion of Angels on the lives of William Blake and Catherine Blake.

His poetry collections include The Death of Mrs Owl (1975), Filibustering in Samsara (1987), Ancient Land: Sacred Whale (1993), Ancestors and Species: New & Selected Ethnographic Poetry (2005) and Conversation with Murasaki (2009).

Selected bibliography

Poetry

 Our After-fate, Softy Loudly Books, 1971
 Eskimo Poems from Canada and Greenland (translation), London: Allison & Busby, 1973; University of Pittsburgh Press, 1973
 The Death of Mrs Owl, London: Anvil Press Poetry, 1975. 
 Booster – A Game of Divination, London: Many Press, 1975
 La Tempesta’s X-ray, Many Press, 1988
 Filibustering in Samsara, Many Press, 1987
 Ancient Land: Sacred Whale, Bloomsbury, Farrar Straus and Giroux, Harvill Press. 
 Ancestors and Species, Shearsman Books, 2005
 Conversation with Murasaki, Shearsman Books, 2009
 From Culbone Wood – in Xanadu: Notebooks and Fanasias, Shearsman Books, 2013
 The Bridge at Uji, Shearsman Books, 2022.

Works on North-west Alaska

 Stories from Point Hope, Alaska State Museum, Juneau, 1973
 Sea Ice Subsistence at Point Hope, Alaska, North Slope Borough, 1980
 The Shaman Aningatchaq, translation & commentary, Many Press, London, 1982
 The Things That Were Said of Them: Oral Histories from Point Hope, University of California Press / Douglas & McIntyre, 1990
 Ancient Land: Sacred Whale, prose and poetry, Bloomsbury, Harvill Press, Farrar Straus & Giroux, 1993 and 2001. 
 Ultimate Americans: Point Hope, Alaska 1826–1909, University of Alaska Press, 2009

Buddhist-related works
 The Vision of the Buddha: Buddhism — The Path to Spiritual Enlightenment, Duncan Baird Publishers /Macmillan, 1996, 
 Treasures of the Buddha, Duncan Baird Publishers, 2006
 Classic Haiku, Duncan Baird Publishers, 2007

References

External links
 Official website

Living people
1941 births
Alumni of Queens' College, Cambridge
20th-century British poets
21st-century British poets
Alumni of the University of Leicester
British scholars of Buddhism
University of Washington alumni
Alumni of SOAS University of London
Male non-fiction writers